Memorial High School is one of eleven high schools in Tulsa Public Schools. The school also encompasses an engineering academy. Memorial includes fine arts offerings and offers several Advanced Placement Program courses. The school offers several foreign language classes (Spanish, Latin, and French). Memorial Stadium is where FC Tulsa plays its games.

Notable alumni

 K. K. Barrett, film and video production designer
 Bradley M. Berkson - U.S. Department of Defense official
 Caleb Green - professional basketball player
 Josh Henderson - actor
 Randy Hughes - NFL football player
 Paul James - Professional gardener, host of HGTV series, "Gardening by the Yard", 1996-2009 
 Kevin Lilly - NFL football player
 Marcus Nash - NFL football player
 Sybil Robson Orr - Wal-Mart heiress and film producer
 Richard Roberts (evangelist) - son of Oral Roberts
 J. Arch Getty - Professor of History at UCLA

References

External links
 Official Tulsa Public Schools Site

Public high schools in Oklahoma
Educational institutions established in 1962
1962 establishments in Oklahoma
Tulsa Public Schools schools